Hyderabad Blues 2 is a 2004 Indian drama film written, directed by Nagesh Kukunoor. The film is a direct sequel to Kukunoor's earlier work Hyderabad Blues produced by Kukunoor, Devika Bahudhanam, and Elahe Hiptoola. Kukunoor for his portrayal of Varun was nominated for "Best Performance in an Indian Film in English" category in the Screen Weekly Awards.

Plot 
The story of the sequel takes place 6 years after the action of the first film. After his marriage with Ashwini, Varun decides to stay in India. He starts a Call Centre while Ashwini is contemplating starting her own clinic. Looking at Seema and Sanjeev's family, and after 6 years of marriage, Ashwini wants to have children, but Varun always avoids the topic saying that the two of them are good for each other, and he doesn't want anyone else in their lovely relationship. As Ashwini becomes increasingly desperate to have children, one of Varun's employees, the young and beautiful Menaka, tries to seduce Varun. Without crossing his limits, Varun stops Menaka. However Ashwini doesn't believe Varun and divorces him, but then realizes her mistake. She apologizes and the couple reunites.

Cast 
 Nagesh Kukunoor as Varun Naidu
 Jyoti Dogra as Ashwini Rao Naidu
 Tisca Chopra as Menaka
 Elahe Hiptoola as Seema Rao
 Vikram Inamdar as Sanjeev Rao
 Anuj Gurwara as Azam
 Anoop Ratnaker Rao as Harish Chandani
 Anu Chengappa as Shashi Naidu
 Soumik Banerjee as Sunny

Soundtrack 
The music of the film is composed by Salim–Sulaiman. The soundtracks in the film are as follows.
 "Slipping Through Your Fingers" – Singer: Trickbaby
 "Tere Bina" – Singer: Fuzön
 "Dil Pe Mat Lo" – Singer: Anand
 "Mo Bhangra Blues" – Singer: Sonic Gurus
 "One Man" – Singer: Trickbaby
 "Mora Saiyaa Mose Bolena" – Singer: Fuzön
 "Sea of Stories" – Singer: Trickbaby
 "Additappa" – Singer: Caliche
 "Palace on Wheels, Aaj ki raat" – Singer: Biddu

References

External links 
 

2004 films
Films set in Hyderabad, India
English-language Indian films
2000s Hindi-language films
Indian sequel films
Indian drama films
Films about immigration to the United States
Films directed by Nagesh Kukunoor
2004 drama films
Hindi-language drama films
2000s English-language films